Stephen George Wenzel (born December 7, 1946) is an American politician in the state of Minnesota. He served in the Minnesota House of Representatives.

References

1946 births
Living people
Democratic Party members of the Minnesota House of Representatives
People from Little Falls, Minnesota
St. Cloud State University alumni